Have I Got a Deal for You is the ninth studio album by American country music artist Reba McEntire, released June 10, 1985. A continuation of the same style of music that made her previous album My Kind of Country a big seller. Unlike its predecessor, which had two #1 Billboard country hits, the highest-charting singles were the #6 title song "Have I Got a Deal for You" and the #5 "Only in My Mind”, her first and only self-written single to date.

Track listing

Personnel 
 Reba McEntire – lead and backing vocals
 John Hobbs – keyboards
 Larry Byrom – guitars
 Billy Joe Walker, Jr. – guitars
 Reggie Young – guitars 
 Weldon Myrick – steel guitar
 Emory Gordy, Jr. – bass
 Matt Betton – drums
 Johnny Gimble – fiddle
 Pake McEntire – backing vocals

Production 
 Jimmy Bowen – producer
 Reba McEntire – producer 
 Ron Treat – recording engineer
 Chuck Ainlay – recording engineer
 Keith Odle – second engineer
 Glenn Meadows – mastering
 Jeff Adamoff – art direction 
 Vartan Kurjian – art direction 
 Andy Engel – design 
 Lisa Powers – photography
 Overdubbed and Mixed at The Castle (Franklin, Tennessee).
 Mastered at Masterfonics (Nashville, Tennessee).

Charts

Album

Singles

Certifications and sales

References

1985 albums
Reba McEntire albums
MCA Records albums
Albums produced by Jimmy Bowen